Dillin is a surname. Notable people with the surname include:

Andrew Dillin, American medical investigator
Dick Dillin (1928–1980), American comics artist
Matt Dillon (born 1964), American actor and director
Samuel Hugh Dillin (1914–2006), American judge

See also
Dillon (disambiguation)